Karasia (stylized as KARASIA) is the concert tour by Korean girl group Kara. This is their very first independent concert in Asia region. The first concert are scheduled at Seoul, South Korea starting mid-February. And at the same time, Kara will embark their very first Japan Nationwide concert starting at Yokohama, sharing the same tour name as their Asia tour. The tour was also planned to have dates in China, Hong Kong, Taiwan, Thailand, Singapore, Indonesia and others, but this never came to fruition.

The 2012 tour concluded on May 27, at Saitama, Japan. The last concert was broadcast live through streaming in 60 different theaters throughout Japan, and all the tickets to the theaters were sold out as well. All solo songs that the girls performed in the Japanese tour was released on the album Kara Collection on September 5, 2012.

On January 6, 2013, the group made a special concert in Japan's Tokyo Dome, titled Karasia 2013 – Happy New Year in Tokyo Dome, making them the first female South Korean act to hold a concert at this particular venue.

A second tour, also titled Karasia, started in Japan on October 8, 2013, which was the last with members Nicole and Jiyoung, as they departed from the group after the second tour's completion. The group then embarked on their third Japanese tour on October 24, 2014, their first with new member Youngji. A fourth Karasia Japanese tour took place in September 2015 and was the group's final tour before their disbandment in January 2016.

Set lists 

{{hidden
|headercss = background: #ccccff; font-size: 100%; width: 70%;
|header = Japan - Happy New Year in Tokyo Dome (2013)
|content =
 "Pandora"
 "Speed Up"
 "Jumping"
 "Dreaming Girl"
 "Honey" (Metal version) (Cyntia's guest performance)
 Drum solo + "I Love Rock 'n' Roll" (Goo Ha-ra's solo)
 "Strong Enough" (Han Seung-yeon's solo)
 "Girl's Power"
 "Kiss Me Tonight"
 "Pretty Girl"
 "Winter Magic"
 "Orion"
 "Ima, Okuritai 'Arigatō'"
 "Humpin' Around" (Nicole Jung's solo)
 "Daydream" (Remix) (Park Gyuri's solo)
 "Gakuen Tengoku" (Kang Ji-young's solo)
 "Lupin"
 "Step"
 "Let it Go"
 "Electric Boy"
 "Go Go Summer!"
 "Jet Coaster Love"
 "Rock U"

Encore:
"Girls Be Ambitious"
"SOS"
"Mister"

Notes:
The Japanese girl rock band Cyntia played a metal version of "Honey" as a special guest performance, as well they were the band on Hara's solo performance.
As opening for Seung-yeon's solo performance, it was shown, in a VTR, pictures of her since Kara's debut until today, as well baby photos of her.
As opening for Gyuri's solo performance, she performed a special ballet from Swan Lake.
As opening for Nicole's solo performance, a VTR of her being a DJ and dancing a song was shown.
As opening for Jiyoung's solo performance, a VTR of some students in a Japanese school praising a photo of her in Girls Forevers album booklet, then call them to go to Tokyo Dome. The band Cyntia played on her performance.
A preview of the group's first TV anime Kara The Animation aired before the performance of "Mister".
}}

Tour dates

DVD

Japanese version

Kara 1st Japan Tour Karasia is the second live DVD of the South Korean girl group Kara. It was released on November 14, 2012, in 2 formats: DVD and Blu-ray and 2 different editions: Limited edition (2 discs) and Regular edition (1 disc). The DVD was scheduled to be released on October 17 along with the group's seventh Japanese single "Electric Boy" but it was postponed to November 14, 2012, due to an error found in one of the discs. The DVD was released along with the group's third Japanese album Girls Forever.

Track listing

Charts

Sales and certifications

Release history

Korean version

2012 Karasia Seoul Concert is the third live DVD of the South Korean girl group Kara. It was released on December 26, 2012, only in DVD format. The DVD contains the first Korean concert of the group held in the Olympic Gymnastics Arena in Seoul, South Korea, during February 18 and 19, 2012.

Track listing

Charts

Sales and certifications

Release history

Tokyo Dome version

Karasia 2013 Happy New Year in Tokyo Dome is the eighth DVD, third Blu-ray and fourth live released by KARA. It was released in 2 formats (DVD and Blu-ray) and 2 editions: Limited and Regular. The limited editions includes a bonus disc with making of, rehearsals and an off-shot movie of the concert. The DVD includes their concert on Tokyo Dome, realized on January 6, 2013.

Track listing

Charts

Sales and certifications

Release history

References 

Kara (South Korean group)
2012 concert tours
2013 concert tours
2014 concert tours
2015 concert tours
Albums recorded at the Tokyo Dome